Choi Hyoung-woo (born December 16, 1983) is a South Korean professional baseball outfielder who plays for the Kia Tigers of the KBO League.

Choi played for the Samsung Lions from 2002 through 2016. Drafted as a catcher, his career got off to a slow start, as he didn't record an RBI in the KBO until 2008. Released by the Lions after the 2005 season, he played for the KBO Futures League farm league Police Baseball Team in 2006 and 2007. While with the Police, Choi switched from catcher to outfielder.

His professional career truly began when he rejoined Samsung in 2008. That year he was named KBO Rookie of the Year. He led the KBO League in home runs (30) and RBIs (118) in 2011, and in batting average (.376) and RBIs (144) in 2016.

In November 2016, he signed a four-year free-agent contract with the Kia Tigers, becoming the first player in KBO history to receive a 10 billion won ($8.5 million) contract.

See also 
 List of KBO career hits leaders
 List of KBO career home run leaders
 List of KBO career RBI leaders

References

External links
Career statistics and player information at Korea Baseball Organization 
 

1983 births
Living people
People from Jeonju
South Korean baseball players
2017 World Baseball Classic players
KBO League outfielders
Samsung Lions players
Kia Tigers players
Sportspeople from North Jeolla Province
Hyoung-woo